The 1968 Wimbledon Championships was a combined men's and women's tennis tournament that took place on the outdoor grass courts at the All England Lawn Tennis and Croquet Club in Wimbledon, London, United Kingdom. The tournament was held from Monday 24 June until Saturday 6 July 1968. It was the 82nd staging of the Wimbledon Championships, and the third Grand Slam tennis event of 1968.

This tournament started the Open Era for Wimbledon, as it became the second Grand Slam tournament to offer prize money and allow professionals to compete after the 1968 French Open. Singles champions Rod Laver and Billie Jean King had already won Wimbledon twice before in the amateur era.

Prize money
The 1968 championships was the first edition of the tournament to offer prize money. The total prize money for the event was £26,150. The winner of the men's title earned £2,000 while the women's singles champion earned £750.

It was the last tournament at which the Men's Singles final was played on a Friday. 

* per team

Champions

Seniors

Men's singles

 Rod Laver defeated  Tony Roche, 6–3, 6–4, 6–2

Women's singles

 Billie Jean King defeated  Judy Tegart, 9–7, 7–5

Men's doubles

 John Newcombe /  Tony Roche defeated  Ken Rosewall /  Fred Stolle, 3–6, 8–6, 5–7, 14–12, 6–3

Women's doubles

 Rosie Casals /  Billie Jean King defeated  Françoise Dürr /  Ann Jones, 3–6, 6–4, 7–5

Mixed doubles

 Ken Fletcher /  Margaret Court defeated  Alex Metreveli /  Olga Morozova, 6–1, 14–12

Juniors

Boys' singles

 John Alexander defeated  Jacques Thamin, 6–1, 6–2

Girls' singles

 Kristy Pigeon defeated  Lesley Hunt, 6–4, 6–3

Seeds

Men's singles
  Rod Laver (champion)
  Ken Rosewall (fourth round, lost to Tony Roche)
  Andrés Gimeno (third round, lost to Raymond Moore)
  John Newcombe (fourth round, lost to Arthur Ashe)
  Roy Emerson (fourth round, lost to Tom Okker)
  Manuel Santana (third round, lost to Clark Graebner)
  Lew Hoad (third round, lost to Bob Hewitt)
  Pancho Gonzales (third round, lost to Alex Metreveli)
  Dennis Ralston (quarterfinals, lost to Rod Laver)
  Butch Buchholz (quarterfinals, lost to Tony Roche)
  Fred Stolle (fourth round, lost to Clark Graebner)
  Tom Okker (quarter-finals, lost to Arthur Ashe)
  Arthur Ashe (semi-finals, lost to Rod Laver)
  Cliff Drysdale (third round, lost to Tom Edlefsen)
  Tony Roche (final, lost to Rod Laver)
  Nikola Pilić (first round, lost to Herb Fitzgibbon)

Women's singles
 Billie Jean King (champion)
 Margaret Court (quarterfinals, lost to Judy Tegart)
 Nancy Richey (semifinals, lost to Judy Tegart)
 Ann Jones (semifinals, lost to Billie Jean King)
 Virginia Wade (first round, lost to Christina Sandberg)
  Maria Bueno (quarterfinals, lost to Nancy Richey)
 Judy Tegart (final, lost to Billie Jean King)
 Lesley Bowrey (quarterfinals, lost to Billie Jean King)

References

External links
 Official Wimbledon Championships website

 
Wimbledon Championships
Wimbledon Championships
Wimbledon Championships
Wimbledon Championships